Waldemar Victorino (born 22 May 1952, in Montevideo) is a Uruguayan former footballer who played as a forward; he played football in 6 countries: Uruguay, Colombia, Italy, Argentina, Ecuador and Peru. Victorino is famous for scoring the winning goal to capture three major titles between 1980-1981. The first was scoring vs. Sport Club Internacional to win the 1980 Copa Libertadores. The second was scoring vs.  Brazil to win the 1980 World Champions' Gold Cup. Finally, he scored vs. Nottingham Forest F.C. to win the 1980 Intercontinental Cup.

Career statistics

International
Source:

Honours

Club
 Nacional
 Primera División Uruguaya: 1980
 Copa Libertadores: 1980
 Intercontinental Cup: 1980

International
 Uruguay
 Mundialito: 1980

References

External links
BDFA profile 

1952 births
Living people
Footballers from Montevideo
Uruguayan footballers
Uruguay international footballers
1979 Copa América players
C.A. Cerro players
C.A. Progreso players
Sport Boys footballers
Club Atlético River Plate (Montevideo) players
Club Nacional de Football players
Deportivo Cali footballers
Cagliari Calcio players
Newell's Old Boys footballers
Club Atlético Colón footballers
 Copa Libertadores-winning players
Expatriate footballers in Argentina
Expatriate footballers in Colombia
Expatriate footballers in Italy
Expatriate footballers in Ecuador
Expatriate footballers in Peru
Expatriate footballers in Venezuela
Uruguayan expatriate footballers
Uruguayan Primera División players
Serie A players
Argentine Primera División players
Uruguayan expatriate sportspeople in Colombia
C.S. Marítimo de Venezuela players
Association football forwards